The Behemoth is an American video game development company that was created in 2003 by John Baez, artist Dan Paladin, and programmers Tom Fulp, Brandon LaCava, and Nick Dryburgh. Dryburgh and LaCava later left the company. The Behemoth development studio is located in San Diego, California. The company is known for producing simple games with Paladin's signature 2D style. Its games are also known for their heavy arcade inspirations, especially among their early games, emulating genres common on the Neo Geo in particular (which Tom Fulp is a noted fan of).

History 
During August 2002, Tom Fulp and Dan Paladin collaborated in creating the Flash game Alien Hominid for Newgrounds. The game has since become extremely popular and generated over twenty million hits. Later in the year, Paladin was working on developing a console video game when co-worker Baez approached him. He was a fan of Alien Hominid and asked Paladin if he was interested in developing the game for consoles. When Baez offered to produce the game, Fulp and Paladin eventually agreed, recruited LaCava and Dryburgh, and formed The Behemoth in 2003. Several details in their games reveal a connected universe between all of them.

Their first console game, Alien Hominid, gained critical acclaim by the media and the members of The Behemoth quickly gained status as indie developers focused on bringing old-school styles of video games back into mainstream gaming. Some of the minigames from Alien Hominid were ported to iOS in 2011.

The Behemoth's second game, Castle Crashers, was released August 27, 2008, originally for the Xbox Live Arcade service, eventually re-releasing for the PlayStation 3 on August 31, 2010, and Microsoft Windows/OS X on September 26, 2012. Since its release on Xbox Live Arcade, Castle Crashers has become one of the most downloaded games, with over 2.6 million copies sold as of year-end 2011. 

A third title, BattleBlock Theater, was released on April 3, 2013 on Xbox Live Arcade.  The Windows, Linux, and macOS versions of BattleBlock Theater were released on Steam on May 15, 2014.

Pit People, is a turn-based strategy game that was released for early access on Steam and was released for Xbox One on January 13, 2017. It was released on March 2, 2018.

The Behemoth had long teased a "Game 5", which was announced in January 2020 as Alien Hominid Invasion, which the developers said was not a remake or remaster of the original Alien Hominid but introduces new mechanics as an arcade shooter.

Games

References

External links 

 

 
2003 establishments in California
Companies based in San Diego
American companies established in 2003
Video game companies established in 2003
Video game companies of the United States
Video game development companies
Indie video game developers
Privately held companies based in California